Clemson Area Transit, a zero-fare bus line known locally as CAT or the "CAT Bus", is the most frequently used transit system in South Carolina. Areas with bus service include Clemson University, the City of Clemson, the County of Anderson, City of Seneca and the Towns of Central and Pendleton. The fare-free system is made possible by federal grants and matching funds from the city and University. CAT operates a modern fleet of buses, including over 10 forty foot long Proterra electric buses, 7 forty foot long NOVA low-floor buses, and two sixty-two foot long articulated NOVA buses dubbed the "Caterpillars"- the first and only two articulated bus currently operated in South Carolina.

Utilizing multiple routes and lines, CAT Buses help transport citizens and students from campus or downtown to surrounding neighborhoods and apartment complexes, and move travelers from the Clemson area to surrounding communities.

The service is jointly operated by the City of Clemson, Clemson University, the Town of Pendleton, City of Seneca, Southern Wesleyan University, and the Town of Central

CAT Bus Lines 
Pendleton Route - service throughout Pendleton and to Tri-County Technical College
Red Route - Service to Central and Clemson
Seneca Express - Connects Clemson to Seneca
Seneca Business Loop
Seneca Residential Loop
Central/SWU/Walmart
Gold Route - Service throughout Clemson, to Patrick Square neighborhood
The Pier/Highpoint Route - Shuttles from apartment complexes to Clemson University

CAT buses are characterized by purple and orange paint schemes. Buses have "Bike & Ride" bike racks. All buses are handicap accessible.  Buses operated in Seneca have a dark blue and gold color scheme.

External links
 CAT Bus website

Clemson University
University and college bus systems
Zero-fare transport services